Whitby—Oshawa was a provincial electoral district in Ontario, Canada, that was represented in the Legislative Assembly of Ontario from the  2007 provincial election until 2018. The riding was adjusted by the 2015 Representation Act for the 2018 provincial election, losing some territory to the district of Oshawa, and replaced as the  district of Whitby.

History

The riding was created in 2003 and consists of 68 percent of the Whitby—Ajax district, 20 percent of the Oshawa district and three percent of the Durham. The provincial electoral district was created from the same ridings in 2007.

It consists of the Town of Whitby and northwestern section of the City of Oshawa (specifically, the portion of the city lying north and west of a line drawn from the western city limit east along King Street West, north along the Oshawa Creek, east along Rossland Road West, north along Simcoe Street North, and east along Winchester Road East to the eastern city limit).

For the 2018 election, Whitby-Oshawa was re-districted as Whitby to more closely correspond to the actual town's borders.

Demographics
According to the Canada 2011 Census
 Population: 146,307
 Ethnic Groups: 81.4% White, 5.5% Black, 4.3% South Asian, 1.7% Chinese, 1.7% Filipino, 1.4% Aboriginal
 Languages: 85.3% English, 2.1% French, 1.5% Italian, 1.1% Chinese
 Religion: 71.2% Christian (32.6% Catholic, 10.3% United Church, 8.3% Anglican, 2.6% Presbyterian, 2.4% Christian Orthodox, 2.1% Baptist, 10.4% Other Christian), 2.6% Muslim, 1.4% Hindu, 23.6% No religion. 
 Average household income: $104,969
 Median household income: $89,608
 Average individual income: $48,444
 Median individual income: $37,099

Members of Provincial Parliament

Election results

2007 electoral reform referendum

References

External links
Elections Ontario Past Election Results

Former provincial electoral districts of Ontario
Politics of Oshawa
Whitby, Ontario